Victor Henry Naismith (1 May 1936 – 26 October 2021) was an Australian rules footballer who played with Richmond in the Victorian Football League (VFL). 

A talented sportsman at tennis, squash, golf and throwing events, Naismith was in contention to compete in the javelin at the 1956 Melbourne Olympics, but injured his shoulder at work. He did however represent the VFL/VFA team in the Australian football exhibition match at the Games.

Notes

External links 		
		
		
		
		
		
		
1936 births
2021 deaths
Australian rules footballers from Victoria (Australia)		
Richmond Football Club players
Oakleigh Football Club players